Gioia Marzocca (born 22 June 1979) is an Italian fencer. She competed in the women's individual sabre events at the 2004, 2008 and 2012 Summer Olympics but did not medal on any occasion.

References

External links
 

1979 births
Living people
Italian female fencers
Olympic fencers of Italy
Fencers at the 2004 Summer Olympics
Fencers at the 2008 Summer Olympics
Fencers at the 2012 Summer Olympics
Universiade medalists in fencing
Sportspeople from Lecco
Universiade bronze medalists for Italy
Medalists at the 2001 Summer Universiade
21st-century Italian women